Black Sheep is a Regency romance novel by Georgette Heyer which was first published in 1966. The story is set in 1816/1817.

Plot summary
The novel is set in Bath, Somerset and centres on two main characters: Miss Abigail Wendover and Mr Miles Calverleigh.

At the beginning of the novel, Abigail's niece Fanny claims to have formed a mutual "lasting attachment" with Stacey Calverleigh, to Abigail's dismay. Stacey is reputed to be a "gamester", a "loose fish", and a "gazetted fortune-hunter"—that is, he has a gambling habit, is a libertine, and is on the look-out for a wealthy marriage. Abigail enlists the assistance of Stacey's cousin, Miles Calverleigh, to prevent a clandestine marriage between Stacey and Fanny. Miles is the black sheep of the Calverleigh family, but Abigail finds herself attracted to his wit and unconventionality.

References

1966 British novels
Novels by Georgette Heyer
Historical novels
Novels set in the 1810s
Novels set in Somerset
The Bodley Head books
Regency romance novels